Tomáš Berdych was the defending champion, but he lost in the quarterfinals to Mikhail Youzhny.

Second-seeded Jo-Wilfried Tsonga won in the final 6–3, 6–3 against Mikhail Youzhny.

Seeds

Draw

Finals

Top half

Bottom half

Qualifying

Seeds

Qualifiers

Draw

First qualifier

Second qualifier

Third qualifier

Fourth qualifier

External links 
 Main draw
 Qualifying draw

2009 Japan Open Tennis Championships